Edward, Ed, Eddie or Ted O'Brien may refer to:

Ed O'Brien (born 1968), guitarist for Radiohead

Edward O'Brien
Sir Edward O'Brien, 2nd Baronet (1705–1765), Irish politician and baronet
Edward Dominic O'Brien (1735–1801), Irish law enforcement official and British Army officer
Sir Edward O'Brien, 4th Baronet (1773–1837), Irish politician and baronet
Edward O'Brien, 14th Baron Inchiquin (1839–1900), Irish peer
Edward Joseph Harrington O'Brien (1890–1941), American writer, poet, editor and anthologist
Edward O'Brien (mural artist) (1910–1975), American artist and muralist
Edward O'Brien (athlete) (1914–1976), American 400m runner
Edward O'Brien (Irish republican) (1974–1996), IRA member

Eddie O'Brien
Eddie O'Brien (baseball) (1930–2014), American former Major League Baseball player
Eddie O'Brien (hurler) (born 1945), Irish hurler
Eddie O'Brien (footballer) (1883–1934), Australian rules footballer

Ted O'Brien
Ted O'Brien (American politician) (born 1957)
Ted O'Brien (Australian politician) (born 1974)

See also
Edward O'Bryen (c. 1753–1808), sometimes O'Brien, Royal Navy admiral